"Flawed Design" is a 2006 song by Canadian indie rock band Stabilo.

Flawed Design may also refer to:

 Flawed Design (album), a 2019 album by Saint Asonia

See also
 Flawed by Design, an American metalcore band
 Design Flaw a 1998 album by Art Bergmann
 Poor design, an argument against the assumption of the existence of a creator God
 Product defect, design flaws in commerce